Technotronic was a Belgian electronic music project formed in 1987 by Jo Bogaert, who gained popularity in Europe as a solo artist with various new beat projects, including Acts of Madmen and Nux Nemo. Together with rapper Manuela Kamosi, he produced the single "Pump Up the Jam", which was originally an instrumental released under the name The Pro 24s. Based on Farley Jackmaster Funk's "The Acid Life", this instrumental initially included vocal samples from Eddie Murphy's "Delirious" live set from 1983 and was months later replaced by newer music, along with lyrics from Kamosi (Ya Kid K) prior to the song's international release in September 1989. With Bogaert adopting the name Thomas De Quincey, a front for the act was put together (in a way similar to other Eurodance/Europop products like Black Box or Milli Vanilli), utilizing Congolese-born fashion model Felly Kilingi who was presented as the group's rapper, appearing on the single's cover art and in the music video.

The song became a worldwide success, eventually reaching No. 2 on both the US Hot 100 and the UK Singles Chart in late 1989 and early 1990.

Also in 1989, Kamosi contributed vocals to the single "Spin That Wheel", produced by Bogaert under another pseudonym called Hi-Tek 3, with Ya Kid K fully credited as guest rapper. This original version was released by The Brothers Organisation in conjunction with Telstar Records UK in early 1990, and reached number 69 in the UK chart.

1990s career
The success of the project's first single led to the release of Pump Up the Jam: The Album, which featured tracks by Ya Kid K and MC Eric. During 1990 the album would climb into the Top 10 of the Billboard 200 in the US and reached No. 2 in the UK Albums Chart. They also became an opening act for Madonna and had appearances on Saturday Night Live, The Arsenio Hall Show, and It's Showtime at the Apollo. It was at this time that Ya Kid K became credited on Technotronic's singles as she was actual featured vocalist, though Felly still lip-synched the backing vocals in the video for "Get Up! (Before The Night Is Over)", a follow-up single which was a No. 7 hit in the US and a No. 2 hit in the UK.

The third UK Top 40 was "This Beat Is Technotronic" (US Dance No. 3, UK No. 14) and featuring MC Eric instead of Ya Kid K; though she was again the featured vocalist on fourth UK hit "Rockin' Over The Beat" (UK No. 9). This song also reached the Top 10 in many countries,

In September 1990, The Brothers Organisation reissued the Hi-Tek 3 single in conjunction with the Teenage Mutant Ninja Turtles film which was coming out in cinemas in the United Kingdom in November 1990 (it had been released into movie theaters in the States, a few months before that). Now called "Spin That Wheel (Turtles Get Real)" with altered lyrics that took out references to drug use, the song reached number 15 in the UK chart, and can be found on the album Teenage Mutant Ninja Turtles: The Original Motion Picture Soundtrack.

A megamix was released compiling many of Technotronic's previous hits. Released as a single, it peaked at No. 6 in the UK and No. 1 on the Eurochart Hot 100. The Megamix single also appeared on the remix album Trip on This: The Remixes, released in late 1990 by ARS and licensed to Telstar in the UK and SBK in the United States. Trip on This featured remixes of all the singles from Pump Up the Jam: The Album, a remix by David Morales of "Spin That Wheel", and the new song "Turn It Up" featuring vocals by Melissa Bell and "Another Monsterjam" rapper MC Einstein.

By 1991, Ya Kid K had left Technotronic to pursue a solo career, releasing the single "Awesome (You Are My Hero)" from the Teenage Mutant Ninja Turtles II: The Secret of the Ooze soundtrack in 1991, followed in 1992 by the solo album, One World Nation. Neither was commercially successful.

"Turn It Up" failed to make an impact on the singles charts. Melissa and Einstein were soon replaced in Technotronic by new vocalist Reggie (Réjane Magloire). Reggie provided vocals to six tracks on 1991's Body To Body, the group's second album, which also featured singer Riv and rapper Colt 45 on two tracks. Several singles were released in Europe, the UK and Australia, including "Move That Body", "Work" and "Money Makes The World Go Round" (featuring Reggie on vocals) during 1991 and 1992.

In 1992, the song "Move This" from Pump Up the Jam: The Album (featuring vocals by Ya Kid K) became popular through its use in a Revlon television commercial, and became the group's third Top 10 hit in the United States, peaking at No. 6. With renewed interest in the Pump Up The Jam album, it was repackaged for the US market in 1992, retaining the original track listing but this time featuring Ya Kid K's face on the cover (not Felly's).

In 1993, a hits album was released, The Greatest Hits. It included the new songs "Hey Yoh Here We Go" and "One + One", both featuring vocals from a returning Ya Kid K, alongside the radio versions of previous hit singles, and entirely new mixes of the tracks "Turn It Up" and "Voices". "Hey Yoh Here We Go" and "One + One" were released as singles in 1993 and 1994 respectively, to moderate success.

Continuing with Ya Kid K as frontwoman, Technotronic released the single "Move It to the Rhythm" in 1994 followed, in 1995, by the album Recall and the further singles "Recall" (featuring Ya Kid K), and "I Want You by My Side". Beside vocal contributions from Kamosi, the album also featured established dance singer Daisy Dee on two tracks, as well as male singer Black Diamond (who featured on the single "I Want You By My Side").

The remix EP "Pump Up The Jam – The '96 Sequel" was released in 1996. The same year, Kamosi collaborated with Robert Clivilles (founder of C+C Music Factory) on the track "Shake That Body" for his album Robi Rob's Club World. The track was released as a single, credited as Robi Rob feat. Ya Kid K. The Technotronic single "Get Up – The '98 Sequel" as well as compilations This Beat Is Technotronic (Hits & Mixes) and Pump Up The Hits were both released in 1998.

Technotronic later returned in 1999 with new singles "G-Train" and "Like This", featuring male vocalist Monday Midnite. In 2000, Ya Kid K returned as the group's vocalist once more, releasing the non-album single "The Mariachi" to moderate success. MC Eric and Ya Kid K reunited to tour parts of Europe, South America and Australia, performing their classic hits as well as new material as a part of tour commemorating Technotronic's 20th anniversary. MC Eric also tours as a DJ.

The compilation album Greatest Remix Hits was released in 2006, including mixes of their most notable hits plus a DVD of their music videos.

Discography

Studio albums

Remix and Compilation albums

Singles

Hi Tek 3

See also
 List of number-one dance hits (United States)
 List of artists who reached number one on the US Dance chart

References

 Pump Up the Jam: The Album – sleeve notes

External links
 Technotronic official MySpace
 Technotronic at Discogs

Belgian new beat music groups
Belgian Eurodance groups
Belgian house music groups
Belgian techno music groups
Musical groups established in 1988
Hip house music groups
SBK Records artists
Aalst, Belgium